Give Me Ten Desperate Men is a 1962 French drama film directed by Pierre Zimmer. It was entered into the 12th Berlin International Film Festival.

Cast
 Gila Almagor
 Pascale Audret as Sara
 Catherine Berg
 Philippe Clair
 Francis Lax
 Jacques Riberolles

References

External links

1962 films
1960s French-language films
1962 drama films
French black-and-white films
Films directed by Pierre Zimmer
1960s French films